Simplicity is the second studio album by British indie rock band Jaws.  The album was self-released on 4 November 2016.

Track listing

Critical reception 

Simplicity received positive reviews from contemporary music critics, including from DIY, Dork, GIGsoup and Read Junk.

Personnel 
 Connor Schofield – vocals, rhythm guitar
 Alex Hudson – lead guitar
 Eddy Geach – drums

References

External links 
 
 

2016 albums
Jaws (band) albums